Rhinobothryum bovallii, commonly known as the coral mimic snake or the false tree coral, is a species of snake in the family Colubridae. The species is native to Central America and northwestern South America.

Etymology
The specific name, bovallii, is in honor of Swedish biologist Carl Bovallius.

Geographic range
R. bovallii is found in Honduras, Nicaragua, Costa Rica, Panama, Colombia, Venezuela, and Ecuador.

Habitat

Reproduction
R. bovallii is oviparous.

Mimicry
R. bovallii mimics two sympatric species of venomous snakes, Micrurus alleni and Micrurus nigrocinctus.

References

Further reading
Andersson LG (1916). "Notes on the reptiles and batrachians in the Zoological Museum at Gothenburg, with an account of some new species". Göteborgs Kungliga Vetenskap och Vitter Hets-Samnalles Handlingar Sjatte Foljden (Series B,4) 17 (5) [= Meddelanden fran Göteborgs Musei Zoologiska Afdelning (9)]: 1-41. ("Rhinobothrium [sic] bovallii ", new species, p. 32, Figure 4).
Freiberg M (1982). Snakes of South America. Hong Kong: T.F.H. Publications. 189 pp. . (Rhinobothryum bovallii, p. 109).
Rojas-Morales, Julián Andrés (2012). "On the geographic distribution of the false coral snake, Rhinobothryum bovallii (Serpentes: Dipsadidae), in Colombia – a biogeographical perspective". Salamandra 48 (4): 243-248.
Rojas-Runjaic, Fernando J. M.; Infante-Rivero, Edwin E. (2018). "Redescubrimiento de las serpientes Rhinobothryium bovallii (Andersson, 1916) y Plesiodipsas perijanensis (Alemán, 1953) en Venezuela". Memoria de la Fundación La Salle de Ciencias Naturales 76 (184): 83–92. (in Spanish, with an abstract in English).

Reptiles described in 1916
Reptiles of Panama
Reptiles of Costa Rica
Reptiles of Honduras
Reptiles of Venezuela
Reptiles of Ecuador
Reptiles of Nicaragua
Reptiles of Colombia
Taxa named by Lars Gabriel Andersson